Patrick Cottencin (Born 1955) is a 20th century painter and sculptor from France.He is known for an outdoor war memorial honoring the 90th Infantry Division (United States)  entitled Les Quatre Braves.

Career
On June 4, 2000, Cottencin unveiled a resin sculpture entitled "Les Quatre Braves" a/k/a "The Four Braves" memorial (sculpture) in Périers, France. The memorial scene includes four American soldiers from the US 90th Infantry Division who lost their lives in the Normandy invasion. His use of bright colors (blue) was evident on the resin sculpture.

Cottencin is also a painter and his work has been displayed in the Contemporary Art Center in Trizay and the Romanesque Abbey of Notre-Dame de Trizay.

Designs

References

External links
American War Memorials
US Army Reserve

1955 births
Living people
French sculptors
20th-century sculptors
20th-century French sculptors
20th-century French painters